Take a Girl Child to Work Day is an annual corporate social investment event, held in South Africa since 2003. Companies involved organise for female learners (school pupils), usually from disadvantaged backgrounds, to spend the day at their place of work on the last Thursday of May. The initiative is organised by Cell C, a cellular service provider, and endorsed by the South African Department of Education. It has been called South Africa's "largest collaborative act of volunteerism".

Rationale and goals 

Despite advances in legislation, the majority of women in South Africa still suffer from gender inequality as they lack the skills to make them economically independent. Women remain under-represented in the formal economy, and more so in corporate leadership positions. This is because there are career opportunities that were previously not accessible to women, and other opportunities that individual women may not be aware of.

Additionally, there are challenges and constraints faced by female South African children:
 teenage pregnancies leading to school dropouts (statistics show that four out of ten girls become pregnant at least once before the age 20)
 HIV/AIDS and child-headed families
 high levels of sexual abuse, rape and violence against women and girls
 under-representation within the corporate world

Thus, the goal of the Take a Girl Child to Work Day initiative is to "deepen the thinking of the girl child with regard to their infinite roles in society, enhance her self-esteem, inspire and motivate her to reach her full potential and through exposure to diverse careers and positive role models assist her to prepare for the world of work". Additionally, Cell C believes that the impact will be far-reaching, as "benefits will be shared as she pass[es] them onto her children, her community and her country".

Each year there is a theme for participants to focus on. For example, in 2009 the theme was "Change your world", a challenge for participants to be self-empowered and "Be the agent of the change [they] want to see in [their] world", taken from the quote by Mahatma Gandhi.

Level of involvement 

Companies may register under different levels of involvement as defined by Cell C:

 Formal partnership is offered to a limited number of companies who sign up before a given deadline. (For example, in 2009 it was offered to the first 260 companies who registered by 3 April.) Formal partners must host a minimum of 20 learners selected by Cell C in cooperation with the Department of Education. Cell C provides transport for the learners, runs introductory workshops for the company and school, and supplies guidebooks and promotional material.
 Supporting partnership is offered to companies who host schools of their choice. (They are encouraged to host schools from historically disadvantaged communities.) Companies provide their own transport. Cell C supplies guidebooks and promotional material.
 Informal partnership is offered to companies who cannot host a school. Instead employees are encouraged to bring their female relatives to work.

Additional initiatives 

Additional initiatives have also been set up to complement the original event:
 A writing competition, where pupils answer a number of questions on a competition form.
 Career Choice Expos have been held in seven provinces since 2007. Their aim is to extend the programme to the remote rural schools, and extend the impact of the event beyond the day. The expos focus on industries where there is a high level of skills shortage among women, including telecommunications, engineering, IT, mining and commerce.
 The Girl Child Bursary Fund was established in 2007 to enable qualifying pupils from disadvantaged backgrounds to gain access to tertiary education. Funds are being raised through public SMS donations (matched by Cell C) and corporate donations.
 Initiative Awards are presented to companies that maintain relationships with the schools they hosted, or otherwise made an effort beyond the annual event.
 Alumni of the event are asked to give feedback, including their current employment status

Male children 

This initiative focuses one whole day on empowering female children, because of their historical and current disadvantages (see Rationale and goals). However, male children are not ignored. They are asked to reflect on their relationship with women, and informed about what behaviours are not acceptable. Exercises given in the handbook are explicitly aimed at both female and male children.

History

Criticisms and concerns 

The criticisms and concerns of any corporate social responsibility initiative also apply to this one. Cell C does not directly counter any concerns on its website, but proposes many positive outcomes and seeks feedback from participants.

In her article Girl children in the workplace – reflections of a mother in the workplace, Illana Melzner argues that the initiative does not address the demands and responsibility of motherhood, nor encourage equal parenting. Given that 80% of women under 50 in South Africa are mothers, she feels that this is the cause of under-representation, rather than a lack of awareness. She feels the responsibility of male partners (in heterosexual relationships) is not given any attention, and suggests scope of the initiative be expanded to "Take a Girl Child to Work and Make a Boy Child Cook the Food, Look after Small Children, Clean the House and Do the Shopping Day". Finally she notes that (in 2005) Cell C itself does not offer day care facilities for its employees, and like many South African corporations, has unequal parental leave.

See also 

 Take Our Daughters and Sons to Work Day, usually held on the fourth Thursday of April in the United States, is a similar initiative launched by the Ms. Foundation for Women in 1993
 International Women's Day on 8 March
 National Women's Day, a South African public holiday on 9 August
 16 Days of Activism against Gender Violence, held between 25 November (International Day against Violence against Women) and 10 December (International Human Rights Day), and known in South Africa as 16 Days of Activism for No Violence against Women and Children
 Women in South Africa
 Women in the workforce

Footnotes

References 

 
 
 
 Cell C, Take a Girl Child to Work Day microsite
 
 
 
 
 
 
 
 

Civil awareness days
Feminism and the family
Feminism and social class
Feminism in South Africa
Women in South Africa
May observances
Recurring events established in 2003
South African culture